Heterotopia may refer to:
 Heterotopia (medicine), the displacement of an organ from its normal position
 Heterotopia (space), a concept of "other spaces" created by the philosopher Michel Foucault
Heterotopia (ballet) of 2006 by William Forsythe
"Heterotopia" (song) of 2017 by music duo Oliver featuring Yelle

See also
 Heterotopy